The Velliangiri Mountains, (Tamil: வெள்ளியங்கிரி மலை) a part of the Nilgiri Biosphere Reserve, are situated at the Western Ghats  of Coimbatore district, Tamil Nadu. Known as the "Sapthagiri, 7 Hills (Tamil: சப்தகிரி, ஏழுமலை) - Seven Mountains", these mountains are held and revered on par with spiritually most powerful place on the planet - Mount Kailash, the legendary abode of Lord Shiva. On the top of the Velliangiri Mountains, Shiva is worshipped as Swayambhu, one who is self-created and in this form, he graces the devotees.

Geography
The Velliangiri hills form a major range in the Western Ghats in the Nilgiri Biosphere Reserve. The seven hills with altitudes ranging from 520 m – 1840 m are bordered by the plains of Coimbatore district to the east, the Palakad district of Kerala on the western boundary, the Nilgiri mountains to the north, and the Siruvani hills on the southern boundary. The annual rainfall is quite variable in the hills (500 mm – 7000 mm) with temperatures ranging from 0 °C during winter to 41 °C in the summer. Many seasonal rivers such as the Neelivaikal, Mayar or Andisunai traverse the hilly landscape. The Noyyal river originating from Velliangiri hills is one of the major tributaries of the Cauvery, which irrigates about 100,000 of hectares of agricultural land in the plains. The Velliangiri hills watershed feeds into the Siruvani dam, which is the main drinking water supply for 1,500,000 people in the urban centre of Coimbatore.

Vegetation is predominantly dry deciduous forests of foothills, second and third mount have evergreen forest and last four belt up shola forest types.

Story of Velliangiri
As per the Kachiappar Perur Purana, Lord Shiva in the hill of Kailayam (Mount Kailash), was worshipped by Lord Vishnu-Komuni. The gracious Lord Shiva appeared before him and asked, "What is your wish?" "My eyes have not seen your dance of grace (Aananda Thaandava). So I wish to see that, said Vishnu. Lord Shiva said: "The two sages Patanjali and Vyaghrapada have performed some of their virtues, and I showed them my dance in Vellinangiri.(Om Nama Shivaya)

In the same way, Lord Vishnu obeyed the command of the Lord Shiva, wearing the Rudraksham, Lord Vishnu went to the southwest of Velliangiri hills and worshipped Lord Shiva.

As per a legend, Vayu Bhaghvan and Adiseshan had a dispute to find out who is superior, to prove the superiority adiseshan encircled the Kailasam, Vayu tried to remove this encircle by creating santamarutham (Twister). Because of the santamarutham, 8 kodumudigal (parts) fell from kailasam into 8 different places which are Thirugonamalai (Trincomalee), Thirukalahasti, Thiruchiramalai, Thiruenkoimalai, Velliangiri Mountains at Tamil Nadu, Neerthagiri, Ratnagiri, and Swethagiri or Thirupangeeli.

Sacredness of these Mountains - The Seven Hills 

Shiva is known as Swayambhu, the source of the creator.

Normally pilgrimage to a place is unlike trekking. Even today going for Kailash is not possible for many. So in this sense, Thenkailaya yatra has become significant and great possibility for one.

The Shiva Temple 
Of all the mountain shrines in Tamil Nadu, the Shiva temple of Velliangiri in the western boundary is considered to be the most famous. Known as Rajathagiri, Velliangiri, Dakshin Kailash or Bhoolok Kailash, this sacred spot, according to legend, is where Shiva performed his cosmic dance on the request of his consort Umadevi. The five faces of Lord Shiva, Brahma, Vishnu, Rudra, Maheshwara and Sadasiva, are seen as Panchagiri and as Panchalingas pertaining to the panchabhutas, in Velliangiri. The hill ranges have abundant natural resources, which include rare herbs.

Lord Panchalingesa and his Consort Manonmani amman alias Parvathi, bestow their grace on the devotees who throng here annually between February and May. There is a plan to provide shelters and temporary toilets near Andisunnai for the devotees during the season.

Getting There 
The Transport Corporation ply buses between Coimbatore (Gandhi Puram) and Poondi every day. Special bus services are available during festive occasions like Maha Shivrathri. Coimbatore is on the international circuit with flights connecting it to Singapore and Sharjah. On the domestic front it is well connected to Kozhikode, Chennai, Kochi, Bangalore, Mumbai, and Delhi by both rail and road.

Experience 

The season that are suitable for trekking this mountain is between mid Feb to mid May (in Tamil months maasi, panguni and chitirai), Entry is restricted by the forest department in the other months. Although entry is said to be given by forest department on new moon day and full moon day upon prior request. We have to be careful about Elephants near Bamboo Trees and other animals.

During the season there is forest check post at the base camp to filter the plastics which will harm the wild animals. Its good to support the forest people for checking and collect some thrown away plastics back from the hills.

Location 
13 km from the foothills of the Poondi temple.
30 km from the commercial center Coimbatore city and near Siruvani, Altitude: 5833 ft.

References 

 வெள்ளியங்கிரி மலை
 Shiva and the Velliangiri Mountains
 Velliangiri Hills Conservation Campaign
 Velliangiri Hills, Ideal Locale for pilgrimage off Kovai
 Manjampatti Valley

External links 

 Holidays for Soul - Velliangiri Hills
 Trekking information on Vellingiri Hills
 Tamilnadu Tourism - Velliangiri Hills
 வெள்ளியங்கிரி மலைக்குப் போலாமா?-
 கோமுனி-திருமால் வழிபட்ட தென்கைலாயம் -பேரூர் புராணம்

Hindu temples in Coimbatore district
Coimbatore district
Geography of Coimbatore
Mountains of the Western Ghats